Michiel Bernhard Emiel Marie Bartman (born 19 May 1967 in Badhoevedorp, North Holland) is a former rower from the Netherlands, who won a total of three Olympic medals during his career. A member of the Nereus Rowing Club from Amsterdam, he won the gold medal in Atlanta with the Holland Acht (Holland Eights), followed by silver in Sydney (Quadruple Sculls) and silver (Eights) once again in Athens. He also won three medals at the World Championships, bronze in the coxed four in 1994, silver with the Holland Acht in 1995 and silver in the Quadruple Sculls in 2001.  Notably the Netherlands eight set the world record in the men's eight in Atlanta that stood until 2002.  Bartman's earned notoriety within the international rowing community as a fierce competitor with a rare ability to time his best performances for the Olympic Games.

After the 2004 Summer Olympics Bartman retired and he became the head coach for Vesper Boat Club in Philadelphia, United States. In December 2004 he was named Amsterdam Sportsman of the Year, together with fellow rower Diederik Simon. In 2011 he was named head coach of Radcliffe lightweight crew (Harvard University).  In 2013 Bartman went on to become the head coach of the Harvard University men's lightweight crew. From 2016 to 2019, Bartman worked as head coach and men's varsity coach at Friends of Port Rowing Club on Long Island, NY. In 2019, Bartman took the position of assistant women's rowing coach at Temple University.

References
 Homepage Michiel Bartman
 Homepage Vesper Boat Club
 Harvard University Lightweight Men's Rowing

1967 births
Living people
Dutch male rowers
Olympic rowers of the Netherlands
Rowers at the 1996 Summer Olympics
Rowers at the 2000 Summer Olympics
Rowers at the 2004 Summer Olympics
Olympic gold medalists for the Netherlands
Olympic silver medalists for the Netherlands
People from Haarlemmermeer
Olympic medalists in rowing
Medalists at the 2004 Summer Olympics
Medalists at the 2000 Summer Olympics
Medalists at the 1996 Summer Olympics
Sportspeople from North Holland